Margarites miona is a species of sea snail, a marine gastropod mollusk in the family Margaritidae.

Description
The height of the shell attains 2 mm.

Distribution
This species occurs in the Atlantic Ocean off Georgia, USA, at depths between 538 m and 805 m

References

External links
 To Encyclopedia of Life
 To USNM Invertebrate Zoology Mollusca Collection
 To World Register of Marine Species

miona
Gastropods described in 1927